John Howard Falloon  (17 February 1942 – 4 October 2005) was a New Zealand politician. He was an MP from 1977 to 1996, representing the National Party in the Pahiatua electorate.

Early life and family
Falloon was born in Masterton on 17 February 1942, the son of Margaret Falloon (née Woodhead) and Douglas John Falloon. He was educated at Lindisfarne College and Massey University, graduating with a diploma in sheep farm management.

Falloon had three children with his wife Philippa. His cousin, Ian Falloon, was one of the first psychiatrists to have family involved in the treatment of schizophrenia.

Member of Parliament

He was first elected to Parliament in the Pahiatua by-election of 1977, replacing Sir Keith Holyoake who had been appointed Governor-General. He retained his seat until he retired.

He held a number of ministerial posts, first in the government of Robert Muldoon, including Postmaster-General, Minister of Statistics, Minister in charge of the Inland Revenue Department and Associate Minister of Finance.

In the government of Jim Bolger, Falloon had posts including Minister of Agriculture, Minister for Forestry, Minister of Friendly Societies, and was the first Minister of Racing.

Honours and awards
In 1990, Falloon was awarded the New Zealand 1990 Commemoration Medal. In the 1997 New Year Honours, Falloon was appointed a Companion of the New Zealand Order of Merit, for public services.

Later life
After resigning from Parliament at the 1996 election, Falloon worked with at-risk children and pursued business interests, such as becoming chairman of Wairarapa winery Lintz Estate.

He had been ill for several weeks after undergoing surgery in Wellington Hospital for a brain tumour and died at his home in Bideford, near Masterton, New Zealand in 2005.

References 

1942 births
2005 deaths
Deaths from cancer in New Zealand
Neurological disease deaths in New Zealand
Deaths from brain tumor
Massey University alumni
Members of the Cabinet of New Zealand
New Zealand National Party MPs
Companions of the New Zealand Order of Merit
Members of the New Zealand House of Representatives
New Zealand MPs for North Island electorates
People from Masterton
People educated at Lindisfarne College, New Zealand
20th-century New Zealand politicians